Sahline is a railway station on the outskirts of Monastir, Tunisia.

The station sits among lagoons used for the extraction of salt. Trains from the station run on the electrified, metre-gauge Sahel Metro line and serve Sousse to the north.

The station lies between the Sousse-Industrial Zone to the west and Sahline Sebkha to the east.

References 

Railway stations in Tunisia